Four square is  a ball game.

Four square may also refer to:

Internet and entertainment
 Foursquare City Guide, a local search and discovery app
 4 Square (game show), a British game show
 4 Square (TV series), a Canadian children's show
 4 Square (pinball), a pinball machine
 Handball (school), an Australian ball game

Organizations
 Foursquare (company), a technology company and the developer of Foursquare City Guide
 Four Square supermarkets
 Four Square Laundry, a front company for a British Army intelligence unit in 1970s Belfast
Foursquare_Church

Other uses
 Four Square (Smithfield, Virginia), U.S., a historic home and farm
 Four square writing method
 American Foursquare, an architectural style
 Four Square (cigarette)

See also
 Russian four square 
 Four-square cipher
 Lagrange's four-square theorem, any natural number equals the sum of four integers squared
 Jacobi's four-square theorem giving the number of distinct ways an integer can be represented as the sum of four squares
 Euler's four-square identity or theorem, the product of two numbers, each of which is a sum of four squares, is itself a sum of four squares.
 Ariel Square Four, a motorcycle